Nuansa Pagi (lit. 'Morning Nuance') is the first morning newscast ever produced by a private television network in Indonesia. Nuansa Pagi debuted on RCTI from 17 January 1993 to 24 August 1993 as Buletin Pagi ('Morning Bulletin') before it evolved to go nationwide on 25 August 1993 as Nuansa Pagi and since then has become one of the strongest morning shows in the country, according to Nielsen Media Research. Nuansa Pagi was also carried by RCTI's then sister network SCTV (1993–1996).

On 9 February 2009, Seputar Indonesia was revamped and is the only news program on RCTI, now called Satu Seputar Indonesia. The morning news program Nuansa Pagi was renamed Seputar Indonesia Pagi. The afternoon news program Buletin Siang was renamed Seputar Indonesia Siang. The late night news program Buletin Malam was renamed Seputar Indonesia Malam. The main evening edition retained the Seputar Indonesia name due to the historical context.

Logos 
On 24 August 1993, the Nuansa Pagi logo was a rainbow half-circle with a box bottom of it, with word NUANSA in the half-circle while PAGI was in the bottom box; used until from 31 July 1998. On 1 August 1998, the Nuansa Pagi 1993 logo has 3D graphics until 23 August 2001.

On 24 August 2001, The Nuansa Pagi used the logo with a square box and a blue Earth Ball, with the letter N and the RCTI Logo at the bottom was used until from 31 July 2002.

On 1 August 2002, The Nuansa Pagi used the logo with a square box and a blue Earth Ball, with the letter N behind the blue Earth ball at the bottom, used until from 7 August 2003.

On 8 August 2003, the logo used was a blue square box bottom and words nuansa pagi and red ball bottom near the letter 'I' was used until 24 August 2006.

On 24 August 2006, the logo was changed to Seputar Indonesia logos from 24 August 2006 until 8 February 2009.

Segments 
 Main News
 Regional
 Crime
 Special
 Sportivo
 Crime News
 Only on Indonesia
 Chosen picture

Host

Aiman Witjaksono (Main Anchor)
Iwan Harjadi (Main Anchor)
Isyana Bagoes Oka (Main Anchor)
Zaldy Noer (Sport and Criminal)
Joice Triatman (Weekend Edition)
Michael Tjandra (Weekend Edition)
Cheryl Tanzil (Former Weekend Edition)

See also
Seputar Indonesia
Buletin Siang
Buletin Malam

Indonesian television news shows
2009 Indonesian television series endings
1991 Indonesian television series debuts
1990s Indonesian television series
2000s Indonesian television series
RCTI original programming
SCTV (TV network) original programming